Theridion melanurum is a species of cobweb spider in the family Theridiidae. It is found in a range from Europe to Siberia, Macaronesia, North Africa, Middle East, and has been introduced into the United States.

References

Theridiidae
Articles created by Qbugbot
Spiders described in 1831